A list of films produced by the Marathi language film industry based in Maharashtra in the year 1975.

1975 Releases
A list of Marathi films released in 1975.

References

Lists of 1975 films by country or language
1975 in Indian cinema
1975